Ahmad Shah Khagga is a Pakistani politician who had been a member of the Provincial Assembly of the Punjab from August 2018 till January 2023. Previously he was a Member of the Provincial Assembly of the Punjab from May 2013 to May 2018. He has been member of privilege committee and member of planning and development committee from 2013 to 2018. He was also in office as Parliamentary Secretary of Energy.

Early life 
He was born on 24 September 1966 in Pakpattan.

Political career

He was elected to the Provincial Assembly of the Punjab as a candidate of Pakistan Muslim League (Q) (PML-Q) from Constituency PP-229 (Pakpattan-III) in 2013 Pakistani general election.

In April 2018, he left PML-Q and joined Pakistan Tehreek-e-Insaf (PTI).

He was re-elected to the Provincial Assembly of the Punjab as a candidate of PTI from Constituency PP-193 (Pakpattan-III) in 2018 Pakistani general election.

References

Living people
Punjab MPAs 2013–2018
1966 births
Pakistan Muslim League (Q) MPAs (Punjab)
Pakistan Tehreek-e-Insaf MPAs (Punjab)